Mónica Sánchez Navarro (born February 4, 1954), is a Mexican television actress.

Filmography

Films

Television

References

External links 

1954 births
20th-century Mexican actresses
21st-century Mexican actresses
Mexican telenovela actresses
Mexican people of Spanish descent
Mexican people of German descent
Living people